The  North American Versatile Hunting Dog Association (NAVHDA) is one of the oldest, largest, and most successful dog training and testing organizations in North America.  Founded in 1969, the organization was started in Goodwood, Ontario, Canada by a group of pudelpointer and griffon enthusiasts. NAVHDA is a nonprofit whose purpose is defined as "to foster, promote, and improve the versatile hunting dog breeds in North America; to conserve game by using well trained reliable hunting dogs before and after the shot; and to aid in the prevention of cruelty to animals by discouraging nonselective and uncontrolled breeding, which produces unwanted and uncared for dogs."  The group has 95 local chapters with 83 in the U.S. and 12 in Canada, which offer regular training and testing programs.

The organization describes its work as a 1999 complement to the activities of sporting dog breed clubs and field trial organizations, "created to supplement the activities of those clubs by providing a proven, standard method of evaluating the performance of all versatile hunting dogs, consistent with North American hunting practices, regardless of breed."

In addition to well-known gundogs such as the German Shorthaired Pointer, NAVHDA recognizes over 30 different breeds of dogs which possess the versatility to hunt, point, and retrieve game. Of importance, the organization's emphasis on versatile hunting dogs means it recognizes and tests breeds for their natural and field abilities along with physical attributes. As such, continental hunting breeds like the Český Fousek are tested and registered even though are not recognized by the AKC. NAVHDA asserts that "the versatile breeds, as we know them today, are products of Europe. No distinctive versatile hunting breed has been developed in North America."

Recognized Versatile Hunting Dog Breeds 
The NAVHDA defines versatility as "the dog that is bred and trained to dependably hunt and point game, to retrieve on both land and water, and to track wounded game on both land and water." The organization currently recognizes over 30 different breeds of versatile hunting dogs.

There are several breeds of versatile dogs common in continental Europe, and with four exceptions, all were developed during the last decades of the 19th century. The four exceptions are much older breeds that provided a base for some of the others. These are the Weimaraner, the Vizsla, the Brittany, and its German cousin, the Small Munsterlander. The tracking hound, pointer and waterpudel were the basic breeding stocks most widely used to develop the short and wirehaired groups. The longhaired group evolved from the Small Munsterlander and flat-coated retriever.

Blue Picardy Spaniel (BP)
Bracco Italiano(BI)
Braque Francais (BF)
Braque d'Auvergne (BA)
Braque du Bourbonnais (BB)
Braque St. Germain (BG)
Brittany Spaniel (BS)
Perdiguero de Burgos (PB)
Český Fousek (CF)
Drentsche Patrijshond (DP)
English Setter (ES)
French Spaniel (FP)
German Longhaired Pointer (GL)
German Shorthaired Pointer (GS)
German Wirehaired Pointer (GW)
Gordon Setter(GO)
Irish Red & White Setter (IR)
Irish Setter (IS)
Large Munsterlander (LM)
Picardy Spaniel (PS)
Pointer (PT)
Portuguese Pointer (PO)
Pudelpointer (PP)
Slovakian Wirehaired Pointer (SH)
Small Munsterlander (SM)
Spinone (SP)
Stichelhaar (ST)
Vizsla (VI)
Weimaraner (WM)
Wirehaired Pointing Griffon (GR)
Wirehaired Vizsla (WV)

References

External links

Hunting dogs